Simeon Shterev (born 8 February 1959) is a Bulgarian former wrestler who competed in the 1988 Summer Olympics. Shterev is also currently the coach of multiple Olympic and World Cup medallist Stanka Zlateva.

References

1959 births
Living people
Olympic wrestlers of Bulgaria
Wrestlers at the 1988 Summer Olympics
Bulgarian male sport wrestlers
Olympic bronze medalists for Bulgaria
Olympic medalists in wrestling
Macedonian Bulgarians
Medalists at the 1988 Summer Olympics
World Wrestling Champions